British Hong Kong competed at the 1962 British Empire and Commonwealth Games in Perth, Western Australia, from 22 November to 1 December 1962.

Athletics

Men
Track events

See also
 Hong Kong at the 1960 Summer Olympics
 Hong Kong at the 1964 Summer Olympics

References

1962
Nations at the 1962 British Empire and Commonwealth Games
British Empire and Commonwealth Games